The Committee for State Security (Komitet za darzhavna sigurnost; abbreviated КДС, CSS, KDS), popularly known as State Security (Държавна сигурност, Darzhhavna sigurnost; abbrievated ДС, DS) was the name of the Bulgarian secret service under the People's Republic of Bulgaria during the Cold War, until 1989. State Security was closely allied with its Soviet counterpart, the KGB.

Structure
 1st Main Directorateforeign intelligence. Succeeded by the National Intelligence Service in 1990.
 2nd Main Directoratecounterintelligence. Succeeded by the National Security Service.
 3rd Directoratemilitary counterintelligence
 4th Directoratesurveillance
 5th Directorategovernment security and protection. Succeeded by the National Protection Service.
 6th Directoratepolitical police. Succeeded by the Main Service for Combating Organized Crime. It had the following departments:
 1st Departmentworked among the intelligentsia and controlling the unions of artists
 2nd Departmentworked in the universities and among the students
 3rd Departmentresponsible for the clergy, Jews, Armenians, and Russian White emigrants
 4th Departmentspecialized in pro-Turkish and pro-Macedonian nationalism
 5th Departmentworked among the political rivals, such as the agrarians and social democrats
 6th Departmentobserved pro-Maoist and anti-party activity
 7th Departmentinformation analysis and anonymous activity
 7th Directorateinformation work

Activity
In 1964, the State Security formed Service 7, led by Colonel Petko Kovachev, dedicated to murder, kidnapping, and disinformation against Bulgarian dissidents living abroad. The unit executed actions against dissidents in Italy, Britain, Denmark, West Germany, Turkey, France, Ethiopia, Sweden, and Switzerland. Documents describing its activities were declassified in 2010.

State Security played an active part in the so-called "Revival Process" to Bulgarianize the Bulgarian Turks in the 1980s, as well as writer and dissident Georgi Markov's 1978 murder on Waterloo Bridge in London known for the "Bulgarian umbrella" that was used.

An issue the international community often raises is State Security's alleged control of the weapons, drugs, alcohol, cigarettes, gold, silver, and antiques traffic through Bulgaria before 1989. It is popularly thought that organised crime in the country in the 1990s was set up by former State Security agents.

The agency is often incriminated with the ill-famed murder of dissident writer Georgi Markov and was formerly accused of the 1981 attempt on Pope John Paul II's life. Bulgaria has always sharply criticized and denied the latter allegation. In a 2002 visit, the Pontiff cleared Bulgaria of any involvement.

In 2018, declassified documents of the Communist Party revealed a plan to foment crisis between Turkey and Greece in 1971. The operation codenamed "Cross" and the plan was that Bulgarian secret agents would set fire on the Ecumenical Patriarchate of Constantinople and make it look like the work of Turks. The declassified documents state that “An intervention” in the religious entity would have “significantly damage[d] Turkish-Greek relations and force[d] the United States to choose one side in the ensuing crisis,”. In addition, the Bulgarians also planned to boost the effect of its operation against Greece and Turkey by conducting “active measures" “for putting the enemy in a position of delusion." The plan was developed by the 7th Department of the First Main Directorate of the DS, and was affirmed by Deputy Head of the Directorate on November 16, 1970, and approved by its Head. The operation was supposed to be prepared by the middle of 1971 and then executed, but it was abandoned.

Legacy 
The secret files of the DS have been a source of great controversy in the country. After the communist regime in the country collapsed, newly established democratic forces accused the former communist elite of secretly removing DS files that could compromise its members. In 2002, former Interior Minister Gen. Atanas Semerdzhiev was found guilty of razing 144,235 files from the DS archives. Others have accused the DS of infiltrating the young opposition.

On 5 April 2007 Bulgarian parliament appointed a special Committee for disclosing the documents and announcing affiliation of Bulgarian citizens to the State Security and the intelligence services of the Bulgarian National Army (or ComDos). It began checking persons who once held or still hold public positions to establish any affiliation. Regular reports are delivered to the parliament and all disclosures are made public on the Committee website and in special publications.

See also 
 The Executioner (Kisyov novel)
 Bulgarian umbrella
Eastern Bloc politics

References 

 Uproar in Bulgaria at death of secret files keeper, Reuters via the Washington Post
 Bulgarians Agree to Open Secret Service Archives, Balkan Insight

Cold War
Counterterrorism
People's Republic of Bulgaria
History of the Bulgarian Communist Party
Collaborators with the Soviet Union
Bulgarian intelligence agencies
National security institutions
Law enforcement in communist states
Eastern Bloc
Secret police
Defunct intelligence agencies